Yorktown Education is a non-profit private school for students ages 5 – 18 years in Plano, Texas.

History 

Yorktown was founded in 2008 by Randall Reiners, who spent over four years studying the education industry before launching the school.  He felt that private schools were either not reflecting what was needed in today's business environment or too costly.  According to Reiners, “Today’s American educational system is outdated and uncompetitive,” he said. “Basically, I determined we needed to find a new way to educate kids.”

Yorktown was first located on the campus of Southern Methodist University in Dallas.  It later moved to a larger facility in Plano.

Yorktown today 

Yorktown is accredited by AdvancED and is a member of the Educational Research Bureau.  Yorktown Education follows a semester system with individualized learning programs, flexible scheduling and dual college credit.

Future plans 

Yorktown was designed to become the first of a national chain of small, high-quality private schools priced at half the cost per student of today's public school system and most private institutions. .

Board of directors

 Mr. Randall Reiners, Founder/Chairman/CEO
 Ms. Heather O'Mara, Director
 Dr. Todd Kettler, Director
 Dr. Matilda Orozco, Director
 Dr. Caprice Young, Director
 Dr. Funkytown Jones Director

References

External links
 Official Website

Private schools in Dallas County, Texas